James Ryan (born 24 July 1996) is an Irish rugby union player who plays as a lock for Irish United Rugby Championship and European Rugby Champions Cup side Leinster.

Youth rugby 
Ryan was captain of the Ireland U20 team throughout the 2015–16 season, leading them to their best ever finish at the 2016 World Rugby Under 20 Championship, where they beat New Zealand U20 for the first time ever, eventually finishing as runners-up to England U20.

Professional career 
Ryan was granted a place in Leinster's academy for the 2016–17 season, but injury meant his season was badly disrupted. Nonetheless, he was given a full senior contract ahead of the 2017–18 season, despite having completed only one of the normal three academy years.

Joe Schmidt called Ryan up to the senior Ireland squad for the first time ahead of the 2017 Summer Tour to the United States and Japan. On 10 June, in the one-off test against the United States, Ryan made his debut for Ireland, coming off the bench and scoring a try. In making his debut, Ryan became the first Irish player since Michael Bent in 2012 to make his senior Ireland debut before making his provincial debut.

Ryan made his competitive debut for Leinster on 2 September 2017, coming off the bench in the provinces opening 2017–18 Pro14 win against Dragons and playing for 21 minutes. He captained Ireland for the first time in their loss to England in the Autumn Nations Cup.

International analysis by opposition

Up to date as of 18 March 2023

Personal life
He is the Great Grandson of Irish Politician and Easter Rising Revolutionary James Ryan

Honours

Individual
 IRUPA Players' Player of the Year winners (1): 2019

Leinster
European Rugby Champions Cup:
Winner (1): 2017–18
Pro14:
Winner (4): 2017–18, 2018–19, 2019–20, 2020–21

Ireland
Six Nations Championship:
Winner (2): 2018, 2023
Grand Slam:
Winner (2):  2018, 2023
Triple Crown:
Winner (3): 2018, 2022, 2023

References

External links

Leinster Profile
Ireland Profile
Pro14 Profile

1996 births
Living people
People educated at St Michael's College, Dublin
Rugby union players from County Dublin
Irish rugby union players
University College Dublin R.F.C. players
Leinster Rugby players
Ireland international rugby union players
Rugby union locks
People from Blackrock, Dublin
Sportspeople from Dún Laoghaire–Rathdown